Rise to Your Knees is the Meat Puppets' eleventh full-length studio album, released on July 17, 2007. Not only was it their first studio release since 2000's Golden Lies, it was also their first to feature the original bassist Cris Kirkwood since his departure after the release of 1995's No Joke!. The album was given a one-month advance release on the iTunes Store and eMusic.

An earlier version of "Enemy Love Song" was available for download on Curt Kirkwood's official website in 2005 prior to the release of his solo album Snow. It was removed after the album was released. In addition to "Enemy Love Song", "New Leaf"  previously appeared on the 2004 compilation album Classic Puppets, this version being recorded by the Golden Lies-era lineup.

Track listing
All songs written by Curt Kirkwood.

"Fly Like the Wind" - 5:31
"On the Rise" - 4:01
"Radio Moth" - 3:44
"Tiny Kingdom" - 5:04
"Enemy Love Song" - 3:24
"Spit" - 4:20
"Island" - 3:51
"Vultures" - 4:09
"Stone Eyes" - 3:59
"This Song" - 4:22
"New Leaf" - 3:57
"Disappear" - 4:18
"The Ship" - 4:17
"Ice" - 6:11
"Light the Fire" - 6:22

Reception
Based on 14 reviews, Metacritic assigned the album rating of 65, indicating "generally favorable reviews".

Personnel
Curt Kirkwood - vocals, guitars, keyboards
Cris Kirkwood - bass guitar, vocals, keyboards, guitjo
Ted Marcus - drums
Stuart Sullivan - Wurlitzer solo on "Enemy Love Song"
Frenchy Smith - hypnosis guitar on "Light the Fire"

References

Meat Puppets albums
2007 albums
Anodyne Records albums